Italy competed at the 1968 Summer Paralympics in Tel Aviv, Israel. The team finished seventh in the medal table and won a total of 39 medals; 12 gold, 10 silver and 17 bronze.

Medalists

Team 
Thirty-eight Italian athletes competed at the Games; thirty-three men and five women.

Roberto Marson 

Roberto Marson, who had previously won two gold medals in athletics at the 1964 Summer Paralympics in Tokyo, was proclaimed the outstanding athlete of the Games. He won ten gold medals, three in athletics field events, three in swimming and four in wheelchair fencing.  He was considered one of the breakout stars of these Games considering his performances.

See also 
 Italy at the 1968 Summer Olympics

References

External links
Media Guide Tokyo 2020 

Nations at the 1968 Summer Paralympics
1968
Paralympics